2000 is the third and last album and only EP by the Croatian hip hop group, Ugly Leaders. The album was released on 31 December 2000.

Background 
The Intro was recorded in November 1994 at Dom Sportova when they were the opening act to Public Enemy, Ice-T and 5ive-O.

On Da Mic was taped in 1996.

Tko je u Kući? (RMX) lasts 3:45, then it's followed by silence until 10:54 then its starts playing an apocalyptic outro.

The album is dedicated to Maja Jakovlić (1974–1997).

Track listing

References

External links 
 at Discogs
 at YouTube

Ugly Leaders albums
2000 EPs